Julia Strachey (14 August 1901 – 1979) was an English writer, born in Allahabad, India, where her father, Oliver Strachey, the elder brother of Lytton Strachey, was a civil servant. Her mother, Ruby Mayer (1881-1959), was of Swiss-German origin. For most of Julia's life she lived in England, where she worked as a model at Poiret, as a photographer and as a publisher's reader, before she embarked upon a career in novel-writing. She is perhaps best remembered for her novella Cheerful Weather for the Wedding.

Early life

Julia Strachey was born in Allahbad, India on 14 August 1901 to Ruby (née Mayer) and Oliver Strachey following their marriage in January 1901. She spent the first six years of her life in India where she had a pet dog called Joseph, before travelling to London.

After her parents' divorce, she moved in with her aunt Elinor Rendel in Melbury Road, off Kensington High Street. Four years later, Julia was sent to Brackenhurst boarding school; and it was during this time that Oliver Strachey began a new romance with Rendel's close friend Ray Costelloe, the niece of Alys Pearsall Smith, then the wife of the British philosopher Bertrand Russell. Julia in turn developed an intimate friendship with Alys, whom she affectionately referred to as 'Aunty Loo'. Smith's unusual and often wicked sense of humour was to have a lasting effect on Julia's literary style.

Bloomsbury and beyond
In 1932 the eccentric and witty Cheerful Weather for the Wedding was published by the Hogarth Press. Virginia Woolf wrote: 'I think it astonishingly good - complete and sharp and individual.' Both through the connections of her uncle Lytton, and the name she made for herself through her writing, Julia soon became integrated into the Bloomsbury Group, frequenting many of its social events. These unique experiences had a strong influence on her fiction. Until 1964, Julia was also an avid member of Bloomsbury's Memoir Club, where she and its other members discussed and wrote about their shared memories.

In 1927 Julia married the sculptor Stephen Tomlin, who created busts of Lytton Strachey and Virginia Woolf.  They separated in 1934. During this period, Julia made a living by writing short stories for magazines. It was also the beginning of her novel-writing career. In 1939, she met the artist (and later critic) Lawrence Gowing, who was, at the time, only 21 years old. The couple went on to spend thirty years together, fifteen of them married, in Newcastle and in Chelsea, before Gowing fell in love with another woman.

Strachey died in 1979 after a long illness.

Published works
 Cheerful Weather for the Wedding (1932), reprinted by Persephone Books in 2009
 'Fragments of a Diary' (1940)
 'Pioneer City' (1943)
 The Man on the Pier (1951), reprinted by Penguin in 1978 under the title An Integrated Man
 'Animalia', published by the New Yorker under the title 'Can't you get me out of here?' (1959)
 'Complements of the season', short story published in Turnstile One, edited by V. S. Pritchett. Published by Turnstile Press. (1948)

See also
 List of Bloomsbury Group people

References

Sources
 Julia - A Portrait of Julia Strachey by Herself and Frances Partridge, Frances Partridge (Gollancz: London, 1983)
 Preface to Cheerful Weather for the Wedding, Frances Partridge (Persephone Books, London: 2009)

1901 births
1979 deaths
Julia
20th-century English women writers
20th-century English writers
Bloomsbury Group
British people in colonial India